Rooms Katholieke Voetbal Vereniging Aristos was an amateur Dutch football club from the city of Amsterdam, established in 1955, and dissolved in 1986, who played their home games at the Sportpark Sloten in Amsterdam Nieuw-West. Its name was derived from 'Rooms Katholieke Voetbal Vereniging' (Roman Catholic Football Club in Dutch), and Aristos, Greek for "best", see Arete (excellence).

Handball
The formerly associated Aristos Amsterdam Handball club is still active and one of the strongest in the region.

References

External links
 Aristos Amsterdam Handball

Defunct football clubs in the Netherlands
Football clubs in Amsterdam
Association football clubs established in 1955
Association football clubs disestablished in 1986
1955 establishments in the Netherlands
1986 disestablishments in the Netherlands